Qarah Dash (also Romanized as Qarah Dāsh, Qareh Dāsh, Karadash, and Qārādāsh; also known as Qal‘eh Qarah Dast and Qal‘eh-ye Qareh Dāsh) is a village in Qaqazan-e Sharqi Rural District, in the Central District of Takestan County, Qazvin Province, Iran. At the 2006 census, its population was 34, in 9 families.

Notes 

Populated places in Takestan County